The 1997 Illawarra Steelers season was the sixteenth in the club's history. The side made its second appearance in the play-offs, the first ending with the infamous 1992 semi-finals 4-0 loss to the St. George Dragons. Whilst making the finals, the season ultimately ended up as a disappointment, losing in the first week to the Gold Coast Chargers. Many expected them to win this match easily as they had beaten their opponents comfortably 28-6 the week before.

Season Summary
The Steelers lost several players before the start of this season, including veterans Neil Piccinelli, David Riolo, Brendan O'Meara and Darren Fritz, leaving a massive hole to be filled by many inexperienced juniors. They gained only halfback/hooker Will Robinson from  Souths. The beginning of the season looked promising for the Steelers with four wins, one draw and one loss from their first six games, leaving them sitting third on the ladder. However, they failed to win any of their next seven games, which included two draws. This middle portion of the season did not bode well for the club’s finals prospects, but to their credit, they won four of their next five games and the final two matches of the season when a post-season berth was on the line. Disappointingly for the Steelers, a 25-14 loss at Parramatta Stadium at the hands of the Gold Coast Chargers in the first week of the finals spelt a disastrous end to a season which could have produced so much more, as some of the country’s most formidable sides were competing in the rival  Telstra Super League tournament.

Player Movements
Gains

Losses

Squad

(captain)

Draw and Results

Quick Summary

March (2-1-1)

Steelers Lineup: Reeves; Wishart, Timmins, McGregor (c), Clifford; Barrett, Air; Bradstreet, Callaway, Smith, Bristow, Mackay, Rodwell. Interchange: Cram, Tunbridge, David, Hart.

Steelers Lineup: Reeves; Wishart, Timmins, McGregor (c), Clifford; Barrett, Air; Bradstreet, Callaway, Smith, Bristow, Mackay, Rodwell. Interchange: Tunbridge, Cram, David, J.Cross.

Steelers Lineup: Reeves; Wishart, Timmins, McGregor (c), Clifford; Barrett, Air; Bradstreet, Callaway, Smith, Bristow, Mackay, Rodwell. Interchange: Tunbridge, Cram, David, J.Cross.

It was a day of draws for the Steelers and the Bears. All three grades were drawn (U-20s: 12-all, Reserves: 18-all, Firsts: 18-all). After capitulating in the second half, the Steelers saw themselves down 18-14, losing their 14-4 lead at half-time. Brendon Hauville scored in the final minutes, in what seemed to be a get-out-jail move by the substitute, who had come on for winger and regular goal-kicker Rod Wishart. What should have been a last-minute victory for the Steelers instead became a fruitless event when Shaun Timmins missed the conversion from in front of the uprights. It was just not their day for defeating the Bears.

Steelers Lineup: Reeves; Wishart, Timmins, McGregor (c), Clifford; Barrett, Robinson; Bradstreet, Callaway, Smith, Cram, Mackay, Rodwell. Interchange:  Tunbridge, J.Cross, Bristow, Hauville.

April (2-0-2)

Steelers Lineup: Reeves; Hauville, Timmins, McGregor (c), Clifford; Barrett, Air; Bradstreet, Robinson, Smith, Cram, Mackay, J.Cross. Interchange: Bristow, Tunbridge, David, Hart.

Steelers Lineup: Reeves; Hauville, Timmins, McGregor (c), Clifford; Barrett, Air; Bradstreet, Robinson, Smith, Cram, Mackay, J.Cross. Interchange: Bristow, Tunbridge, David, Hart.

Steelers Lineup: Reeves; Hauville, Timmins, McGregor (c), Clifford; Barrett, Air; Bradstreet, Robinson, Smith, Cram, Mackay, J.Cross. Interchange: Bristow, David, Tunbridge, Seru.

Steelers Lineup: Reeves; Seru, Timmins, McGregor (c), Clifford; Barrett, Air; Cram, Robinson, Smith, Bradstreet, Mackay, J.Cross. Interchange: Bristow, David, Rodwell, Tunbridge.

May (0-2-2)

A gripping twelve try game. By the end of the match these two clubs equalled the premiership record for the highest score for a drawn game at 34-all. Manly started great and finished strong. The Steelers were up 34-22 with six minutes remaining. However, they only had eleven men on the field and the Sea Eagles ran them home. Five-Eighth Trent Barrett was sent off in the 66th minute for a high tackle on Steve Menzies and David Cox was sin binned in the 69th minute. Manly stayed at the top of the table with 15 points and the Steelers were sitting fifth with ten by the end of the round. Barrett received a two-match ban for the tackle.

Steelers Lineup: Reeves; Seru, Rodwell, Timmins, Clifford; Barrett, Air; Smith, Robinson, Bradstreet, Bristow, Mackay, J.Cross (c). Interchange: Cram, David, Cox, Purcell.

The supporters stayed away from Saturday night's wind and rain. Everything about the night was miserable for the five-thousand Steelers fans that bothered to show up. Only one try was scored in stark contrast to the entertaining twelve-try feast of the previous week against the Manly Sea Eagles at the same venue. Both fullbacks, Brendon Reeves (Illawarra) and Andrew Leeds (Wests), were sin binned during the game.

Steelers Lineup: Reeves; Seru, Timmins, Rodwell, Clifford; Purcell, Air; Bradstreet, Robinson, Smith, David, Bristow, J.Cross (c). Interchange: Cram, Cox, Hart, Hooper.

Brendan Hurst's late field goal leaves Illawarra's chances in the competition diminishing, dropping to seventh on ten points with Wests and St. George waiting eagerly below them, also with ten points.

Steelers Lineup: Seru; Wishart, Rodwell, McGregor (c), Clifford; Timmins, Robinson; Cram, J.Cross, Smith, Bristow, Bradstreet, Hart. Interchange: Reeves, Cox, David, M.Cross.

Illawarra's thrilling third draw of the campaign, and a high scoring one at that (28-all). Another ten-tries put on by the players, giving the crowd of less than five-thousand their money's worth. Steelers supports certainly couldn't help but feel if they had of gotten over the line in at least two of these three games their season might have shaped up differently. After this game, Illawarra was sitting in eighth place, outside of play-off's contention for the first time this season.

Steelers Lineup: Reeves; Seru, Rodwell, Timmins, Clifford; Barrett, Robinson; Cram, J.Cross (c), Bradstreet, Bristow, Hart, Mackay. Interchange: Cox, Tunbridge, Lamey, Leikvoll.

June (1-0-1)

It was a disappointing first Friday Night Football of the season for the Illawarra side at home, losing 18-6 to a Balmain Tigers side seething from their second-round loss at Leichhardt the first time these two teams met in the season. The Tigers held onto their 12-0 lead at the break. Barrett got one back for the Steelers, taking them only six points behind, but an Adam Starr try held-off any attempted comeback. The result aided the Steelers slip down the ladder into tenth.

Steelers Lineup: Reeves; Seru, Rodwell, Timmins, Clifford; Barrett, Robinson; Cram, Callaway, Bradstreet, Hart, Mackay, J.Cross (c). Interchange: Cox, Bristow, Leikvoll, Air.

The third and final game of weekend due to the split round saw the Steelers side completely dominate the St. George team, but they failed to convert their superiority into points. They eventually got themselves over the line with two minutes remaining through experienced centre Brett Rodwell, winning 12-10. The win saw them leap-frog St. George and Balmain back up into eighth position, one place away from finals footy.

Steelers Lineup: Reeves; Britten, Rodwell, Timmins, Clifford; Air, Robinson; Cram, Callaway, Bradstreet, Hart, Mackay, J.Cross (c). Interchange: Leikvoll, Lamey, Cox.

Ladder

Home Crowd Averages

References

Illawarra Steelers seasons
Illawarra Steelers season